The Posco Art Museum is a museum in Seoul, South Korea.

See also
List of museums in South Korea
POSCO

External links
Official site 

Art museums and galleries in Seoul
POSCO